John Manson Munro House is a historic home located at Cuba, Crawford County, Missouri. It was built about 1888, and is a -story, irregular shaped, Queen Anne style red brick dwelling. It has multiple projecting bays and features a wraparound porch.

It was listed on the National Register of Historic Places in 2014.

References

Houses on the National Register of Historic Places in Missouri
Queen Anne architecture in Missouri
Houses completed in 1888
Buildings and structures in Crawford County, Missouri
National Register of Historic Places in Crawford County, Missouri